HMS New Zealand was one of three s built for the defence of the British Empire. Launched in 1911, the ship was funded by the government of New Zealand as a gift to Britain, and she was commissioned into the Royal Navy in 1912. She had been intended for the China Station, but was released by the New Zealand government at the request of the Admiralty for service in British waters.

During 1913, New Zealand was sent on a ten-month tour of the British Dominions, with an emphasis on a visit to her namesake nation. She was back in British waters at the start of the First World War, and operated as part of the Royal Navy's Grand Fleet, in opposition to the German High Seas Fleet. During the war, the battlecruiser participated in all three of the major North Sea battles—Heligoland Bight, Dogger Bank, and Jutland—and was involved in the response to the inconclusive Raid on Scarborough, and the Second Battle of Heligoland Bight. New Zealand contributed to the destruction of two cruisers during her wartime service and was hit by enemy fire only once, sustaining no casualties; her status as a "lucky ship" was attributed by the crew to a Māori piupiu (warrior's skirt) and hei-tiki (pendant) worn by the captain during battle.

After the war, New Zealand was sent on a second world tour, this time to allow Admiral John Jellicoe to review the naval defences of the Dominions. In 1920, the battlecruiser was placed in reserve. She was broken up for scrap in 1922 in order to meet the United Kingdom's tonnage limit in the disarmament provisions of the Washington Naval Treaty.

Design
The Indefatigable class was not a significant improvement on the preceding ; the main difference was the enlargement of the dimensions to give the ships' two wing turrets a wider arc of fire. The ships were smaller and not as well protected as the contemporary German battlecruiser  and subsequent German designs. While Von der Tanns characteristics were not known when the lead ship of the class, was laid down in February 1909, the Royal Navy obtained accurate information on the German ship before work began on New Zealand and her sister ship .

She initially had a crew of 818 officers and ratings, though this was to increase in subsequent years. At the time of her visit to New Zealand in 1913 the engineering department had a staff of 335.

The ship was powered by two sets of Parsons direct-drive steam turbines, each driving two propeller shafts, using steam provided by 31 coal-burning Babcock & Wilcox boilers.

The ship carried eight BL 12-inch Mk X guns in four twin gun turrets. Two turrets were mounted fore and aft on the centreline, identified as 'A' and 'X' respectively. The other two were wing turrets mounted amidships and staggered diagonally: 'P' was forward and to port of the centre funnel, while 'Q' was situated starboard and aft. Each wing turret had a limited ability to fire to the opposite side, but if the ship was full broadside to her target she could bring all eight main guns to bear. Her secondary armament consisted of sixteen 4-inch BL Mk VII guns positioned in the superstructure. She mounted two 18-inch submerged torpedo tubes, one on each side aft of 'X' barbette, and twelve torpedoes were carried.

The Indefatigables were protected by a waterline  armoured belt that extended between and covered the end barbettes.

New Zealands 'A' turret was fitted with a  rangefinder at the rear of the turret roof. It was also equipped to control the entire main armament in the event that the normal fire control positions were knocked out or communication between the primary positions and the gun layers was disabled.

Wartime modifications
The ship was fitted with a single QF 6 pounder Hotchkiss anti-aircraft (AA) gun from October 1914 to the end of 1915. In March 1915, a single QF 3 inch 20 cwt AA gun was added. It was provided with 500 rounds. The battlecruiser's 4-inch guns were enclosed in casemates and given blast shields during a refit in November to better protect the gun crews from weather and enemy action. Two aft guns were removed at the same time.

New Zealand received a fire-control director sometime between mid-1915 and May 1916; this centralised fire control under the director officer, who now fired the guns. The turret crewmen merely had to follow pointers transmitted from the director to align their guns on the target. This greatly increased accuracy, as it was easier to spot the fall of shells and eliminated the problem of the ship's roll dispersing the shells when each turret fired independently.

To address deficiencies in the armour of British capital ships raised by the Battle of Jutland New Zealand entered the dockyard in November 1916 where an additional inch of armour was added to selected horizontal areas of the main deck. During a refit in June 1917 the armour was again improved when 1-inch armour plate was added on the lower deck at the bottom of the Inner and Outer Upper Coal bunkers as well as over the boiler.

By 1918, New Zealand carried two aircraft, a Sopwith Pup and a Sopwith 1½ Strutter, on flying-off ramps fitted on top of 'P' and 'Q' turrets. The Pup was intended to shoot down Zeppelins while the 1½ Strutter was used for spotting and reconnaissance. Each platform had a canvas hangar to protect the aircraft during inclement weather.

Post-war modifications
In preparation for its role as Admiral Jellicoe’s personal transport for his planned visit to Australia, Canada, India and New Zealand New Zealand was refitted between December 1918 and February 1919. The fore topmast and both top gallants were replaced. Her flying-off platforms were removed and new peacetime trim was installed. The range clocks were removed and the deflection scales on the turrets were painted over. The lower forward four-inch guns were removed and replaced with cabins on the port and starboard sides of the forward superstructure to house Jellicoe and provide offices for his staff of eight.

While in Bombay in 1919 the battlecruiser was painted in a light grey colour.

Acquisition and construction

At the start of the 20th century, the British Admiralty maintained that naval defence of the British Empire, including the Dominions, should be unified under the Royal Navy. Attitudes on this matter softened during the first decade, and at the 1909 Imperial Conference, the Admiralty proposed the creation of Fleet Units: forces consisting of a battlecruiser, three light cruisers, six destroyers, and three submarines. While Australia and Canada were encouraged to purchase fleet units to serve as the core of new national navies, other fleet units would be operated by the Royal Navy at distant bases, particularly in the Far East; New Zealand was asked to partially subsidise a fleet unit for the China Station.

To this end, the Prime Minister of New Zealand, Sir Joseph Ward, announced on 22 March 1909 that his country would fund a battleship (later changed to an ) as an example to other countries. It is unclear why this design was selected, given that it was known to be inferior to the battlecruisers entering service with the Imperial German Navy. Historian John Roberts has suggested that the request may have been attributable to the Royal Navy's practice of using small battleships and large cruisers as flagships of stations far from the United Kingdom, or it might have reflected the preferences of the First Sea Lord, Admiral of the Fleet John Fisher, preferences not widely shared. The New Zealand Government took out a loan to fund the cost of the ship.

Naming of the ship
When it came to naming the new ship the most obvious name was already being used by the existing King Edward VII-class battleship HMS New Zealand. It was decided to transfer the name to the new battlecruiser and to rename the older ship. Among the suggested names were Arawa, Caledonia, Wellington and Maori (which was already being used by a destroyer, and thus would have required a double renaming) being floated before Zealandia was eventually decided upon and subsequently approved by the King.

Construction
Wright has identified that the Controller of the Admiralty John Jellicoe had wanted to have Australia and New Zealand constructed by the same shipbuilder. This would have reduced construction costs and simplified administration. Tenders were issued early in 1910, but of those who were prepared to tender, all were only prepared to construct one vessel. Both Australia and New Zealand for unknown reasons agreed to accept that of John Brown & Company which was highest of the two successful tenders, but the former signalled its acceptance first, leaving New Zealand to accept that of Fairfield Shipbuilding and Engineering. The estimated cost of Fairfield’s offer was £1.8 million, which included the guns and the first issue of ammunition. Fairfield had already built HMS Indomitable, which would have given them confidence in their cost estimate, which included all stores including first coal and ammunition. In the end John Brown & Company delivered Australia well under their original tendered price.

New Zealands keel was laid at Fairfield's yard on the Clyde on 20 June 1910.

The construction contract was between the Admiralty and Fairfield (using the Admiralty’s standard contract terms) and was overseen by the Admiralty with manufacturer’s payment claims being approved and then passed on by the Admiralty to the New Zealand High Commission’s office in London for forwarding onto New Zealand for payment. Variation claims were often individually itemised (such as £1. 12s. 6d. for a specific drawing) and passed on for payment, with some payments still being processed as late as the 1914-15 financial year. The ship was built with all stores supplied from the Admiralty at the "Rate Book" price plus 20 percent, with exception of the coal. The Admiralty did not charge New Zealand for its management of the project. Fairchild’s share of the contract made a profit of £50,454 (6 percent).

The four main gun mountings were made by Armstrong Whitworth’s Elswick Ordnance Works, at a cost of £207,593 (excluding delivery and assembly) while the guns were supplied by both Armstrong Whitworth and Vickers. The 22 x 12-inch guns (which included six spares) and 36 x 4-inch guns (which included four spares) required to equip both of the Dominion’s ships cost a combined total of £249,550.

New Zealand was launched on 1 July 1911 in front of 8,000 onlookers by Lady Theresa Ward, the wife of Sir Joseph Ward, using a bottle of New Zealand wine for the christening. 
Following her launch New Zealand was moved by the Clyde Shipping Company’s tugs Flying Linnet and  Flying Swallow to the shipyard’s fitting out basin, for installation of the boilers, engines, and auxiliary machinery though temporary openings in the main deck before the superstructure and armament was installed. 
  
The battlecruiser's first captain, 40 year old Lionel Halsey took command on 21 September 1912.

Sea trials began in October with the hull checked in dry dock on 8 October prior to a 30 hour steam test at three-quarter power being undertaken on the 9 and 10 October. Full power tests were conducted off Polperro on 14 October with 49,048 hp being generated. These tests found that she met her design speed with an average speed over an eight hour period of 25.1 knots (by log) and 26.1 knots (by bearings) while experiencing near ideal sea conditions with the machinery generating 49,048 hp at an average of 297.687 revolutions. Over the “measured mile” she reached 25.49 knots (based on revolutions) and 26.3 knots (by bearings). 
Following gun and torpedo trials in mid-October the battlecruiser returned to Fairfield to correct any defects and make modifications before acceptance inspections commenced in mid-November.

New Zealand was formally commissioned at Govan on 19 November 1912. 
The Admiralty required that all new ships be drydocked as part of the acceptance process to allow the completion and inspection of all underwater fittings. As Fairchild didn’t have their own drydock, the ship sailed from Govan with the nucleus of her crew to Devonport to use that shipyard’s facilities. By now the ship’s hull had spent a considerable time in Fairchild’s often polluted fitting out basin, so the hull was cleaned and then painted with a fresh anti-fouling coating.

The ship was officially completed on 23 November 1912, when she reached her nominally full complement of crew. Her officers by now included three New Zealanders, Lieutenant Alexander David Boyle (1887–1965), Lieutenant Rupert Clare Garsia and Midshipman Hugh Beckett Anderson (1897–1971), all from Christchurch.

]

To signal her upcoming completion the New Zealand government commissioned the marine artist William Lionel Wyllie to produce a painting of New Zealand which he titled Tower House', Portsmouth [HMS “New Zealand” fitting out]. In subsequent years he also produced other paintings of the ship.

Service history
In December 1912 the battlecruiser began the task of working up prior to joining the 1st Battlecruiser Squadron. While at sea over the 1912-13 New Year some of the masting was damaged by a storm.

1913 circumnavigation of the world

In 1912 it was agreed that the ship would visit its donor country as a thank you for funding its construction, with a basic nine month long itinerary developed in the last months of 1912.
To facilitate the flag-waving cruise New Zealand was temporary detached from the 1st Battlecruiser Squadron on 20 January 1913 for the duration of the voyage with Halsey having independent command. The initial date of departure progressively moved backward into 1913 with the ship finally departing the Royal Navy dockyard at Devonport on 28 January for Portsmouth which it reached two days later.

On 3 February, 300 expatriate New Zealanders organized by Sir Thomas Mackenzie (New Zealand’s  High Commissioner to the United Kingdom)  visited the ship at which he unveiled the battlecruiser’s coat or arms (which had been gifted by the  country’s expatriate community in the United Kingdom). This was followed by a visit by King George V (accompanied by Winston Churchill and James Allen (New Zealand’s Minister of Finance and Defence) and other high–ranking officials on 5 February 1913.

As soon as the King’s party had departed New Zealand took on coal before departing Portsmouth on 6 February. There were stops at St Vincent, Ascension Island, Cape Town, Simon’s Town and Durban in South Africa and then at Melbourne in Australia before New Zealand reached Wellington, New Zealand on 12 April.  This was the start of an event that gripped the country as thousands of New Zealanders came to catch a sight of and where possible visit “our Dreadnought”. For the ship’s crew this meant having to attend a constant parade of events and festivities. 
 
After an 11 day stay in the capital New Zealand proceeded up the east coast of the North Island to visit Napier, Gisborne and Auckland, before streaming south to visit Lyttelton, Akaroa, where she exercised with HMS Pyramus before continuing on to Timaru, Otago Harbour, Bluff,  Milford Sound, Greymouth, Westport, Nelson, Picton, before stopping again at Wellington. From there she proceeded up the West Coast of the North Island visiting  Wanganui, Russell and back to Auckland which was reached on 21 June.

The battlecruiser received numerous gifts while in New Zealand, including a naval ensign and a union jack.
Two greenstone hei-tiki (pendants), which were intended to ward off evil were gifted to the ship. One was given by the Boy Scouts of Wellington on 13 April. and the second by Christchurch businessman C. J. Sloman in May 1913. He had deposited the hei-tiki at Canterbury Museum in 1913 and then uplifted it a few months later in order to lend it to the ship on the condition that it had to be returned to Canterbury Museum should the name New Zealand ever be removed from the navy list.

The most notable gift was the personal gift to Halsey of a Māori piupiu (a warrior's skirt made from rolled flax).
According to legend the chief who gave the piupiu to Halsey, instructed him to wear it during battle in order to protect the ship and its crew. If he did, then the ship would be involved in three sea battles; it would be hit only once; and that no one on board would be killed. On many of these occasions speeches were often given in the Māori language, which may resulted in a misunderstanding about the purpose of the gift.
It is unclear exactly who presented the piupiu to Halsey, as he did not record details about who it was or about any prophesy.
There are a number of possibilities as to who gifted the piupiu. One is that it was given by Rotorua  Māori in Auckland on 26 June. Another is that it was given by Rangitīaria Dennan in Rotorua on 7 May. This account is supported by Halsey’s daughter, which mentions meeting Dennan and a discussion with him about her father being gifted a piupiu when he made an honorary chief of the tribe. Another possibility was that the piupiu was given by the Te Arawa chief Mita Taupopoki. 
On the 17 April a large group from Ngāti Raukawa visited the battlecruiser in Wellington at which it is recorded that “a presentation of piupiu (garments of war)” were made.
Another likely candidate was that the piupiu was given to Halsey on behalf of Ngāi Tahu chief Mana Himiona Te Ataotu by Southern Māori MP, Taare Rakatauhake Parata (Charles Rere Parata) when he visited the ship in Wellington on 19 April 1913. On this occasion a piupiu was recorded as being given.
A delegation of 25 leading Māori (including Māori members of parliament) did visit the battlecruiser in Wellington on 21 April among whom was Tureiti Te Heuheu Tukino V a leading chief of the Ngāti Tūwharetoa, But this occasion it was reported that “two kiwi robes, a tangiwai pendant, two korowai robes, and a kickio ("carpet mat") were gifted.

As a result of this visit the officers and crew of New Zealand were to maintain a close relationship with her donor country and its citizens over her years of service and her adventures were closely followed in the Dominion’s newspapers. Though none of the crew were Māori they would occasionally perform the haka (in which they had received instruction while in New Zealand) at functions. The ship’s Māori connection was also maintained by its official letterhead paper featuring the "Aotearoa", which was the Māori word for New Zealand.

By the time the battlecruiser departed New Zealand from Auckland on 28 June for Fiji, a total of 376,114 New Zealanders had visited the vessel during her time in the country, though other sources quote 376,086, 368,118. and 378,068. It is estimated that approximately another 125,000 had been able to see the ship either from the shore or from boats. At the time the country had a population of one million. 
The battlecruiser streamed across the Pacific via Suva, Fiji and Honolulu to dock on 23 July at the naval base of Esquimalt on Vancouver Island, Canada.

After departing Esquimalt New Zealand headed south stopping at Mazatlán, Acapulco, Panama City, Callao, Valparaíso, Punta Arenas, before she steamed through the Strait of Magellan and on to Montevideo, Rio Janeiro, then various islands of the Caribbean and finally Halifax, Nova Scotia (in Canada) before arriving in Portsmouth on 8 December 1913 having circumnavigated the globe.

She had sailed 45,320 miles, consumed 31,833 tons of coal and had been visited by 500,151 people in what was the longest voyage to date by a vessel of the dreadnought era.

The voyage was judged such a success that Halsey was knighted for his efforts.

Assigned to the Grand fleet
The Admiralty requested that New Zealand return to the United Kingdom when the tour concluded, rather than remain in the Pacific region as originally planned. The New Zealand Government acceded to the request. 
As a result upon her return to the United Kingdom, New Zealand joined the 1st Battlecruiser Squadron (1st BCS) of the Grand Fleet. The squadron visited Brest in February 1914, and Riga, Reval and Kronstadt in the Russian Empire the following June.  While there they were visited by the Tsar and Tssarina on the 27 June and that evening hosted in a formal ball in conjunction with Lion, which was moored alongside.
On the 29 June the squadron departed for the United Kingdom. The intention was that New Zealand would decommission on 30 August prior to transferring to the Mediterranean fleet where she would become the flagship of Rear Admiral Archibald Moore, but the outbreak of war cancelled that deployment.

First World War
On 19 August 1914, shortly after the First World War began, New Zealand was transferred to the 2nd Battlecruiser Squadron (2nd BCS)).

Battle of Heligoland Bight

New Zealands first wartime action was the Battle of Heligoland Bight on 28 August 1914, as part of the battlecruiser force under the command of Admiral David Beatty. Beatty's ships were originally intended to provide distant support for the British cruisers and destroyers closer to the German coast, in case large units of the High Seas Fleet sortied in response to the British attacks once the tide rose. When the British light forces failed to disengage on schedule at 11:35, the battlecruisers, led by Beatty aboard his flagship, began to head south at full speed to reinforce the smaller British ships; the rising tide meant that German capital ships would be able to clear the sandbar at the mouth of the Jade estuary.

The brand-new light cruiser  had been crippled earlier in the battle and was under fire from the German light cruisers  and  when Beatty's battlecruisers loomed out of the mist at 12:37. By this time, New Zealand had fallen behind the three newer and faster battlecruisers and was not in position to significantly participate in the battle. Strassburg was able to evade fire by hiding in the mists, but Cöln remained visible and was quickly crippled by the British squadron. He turned to pursue, but Ariadne was set afire after only three salvos fired from under . At 13:10, Beatty turned north and made a general signal to retire. Shortly after turning north, the battlecruisers encountered the crippled Cöln, which was sunk by two salvos from Lion. During the battle, New Zealands captain, Lionel Halsey, wore the Māori piupiu over his uniform, setting a tradition followed for the duration of the war. Two days after the battle, New Zealand was transferred back to the 1st BCS, when the battlecruiser  arrived from the Mediterranean.

Raid on Scarborough

The German Navy had decided on a strategy of bombarding British towns on the North Sea coast in an attempt to draw out the Royal Navy and destroy elements of it in detail. An earlier raid on Yarmouth on 3 November 1914 had been partially successful, but a larger-scale operation was later devised by Admiral Franz von Hipper. The fast battlecruisers would conduct the bombardment, while the rest of the High Seas Fleet stationed itself east of Dogger Bank, so they could cover the battlecruisers' return and destroy any pursuing British vessels. Having broken the German naval codes, the British were planning to catch the raiding force on its return journey, although they were not aware of the High Seas Fleet's presence. Admiral Beatty's 1st BCS (now reduced to four ships, including New Zealand) and the 2nd Battle Squadron (consisting of six dreadnoughts) were detached from the Grand Fleet in an attempt to intercept the Germans near Dogger Bank.

Admiral Hipper's raiders set sail on 15 December 1914, and successfully bombarded several English towns; British destroyers escorting the 1st BCS had already encountered German destroyers of the High Seas Fleet at 05:15 and fought an inconclusive action with them. Vice Admiral Sir George Warrender, commanding the 2nd Battle Squadron, had received a signal at 05:40 that the destroyer  was engaging enemy destroyers, although Beatty had not. The destroyer  spotted the German armoured cruiser  and her escorts at about 07:00, but could not transmit the message until 07:25. Admiral Warrender received the signal, as did New Zealand, but Beatty, aboard Lion, did not, even though New Zealand had been specifically tasked to relay messages between the destroyers and the flagship. Warrender attempted to pass on Shark's message to Beatty at 07:36, but did not manage to make contact until 07:55. On receiving the message, Beatty reversed course, and dispatched New Zealand to search for Roon. She was being overhauled by New Zealand when Beatty received messages that Scarborough was being shelled at 09:00. Beatty ordered New Zealand to rejoin the squadron and turned west for Scarborough.

The British forces, heading west to cover the main route through the minefields protecting the coast of England, split up while passing the shallow Southwest Patch of Dogger Bank; Beatty's ships headed to the north, while Warrender passed to the south. This left a  gap between them, through which the German light forces began to move. At 12:25, the light cruisers of the II Scouting Group began to pass the British forces searching for Hipper. The light cruiser  spotted the light cruiser  and signalled a report to Beatty. At 12:30, Beatty turned his battlecruisers toward the German ships, which he presumed were the advance screen for Hipper's ships. However, those were some  behind. The 2nd Light Cruiser Squadron, which had been screening for Beatty's ships, detached to pursue the German cruisers, but a misinterpreted signal from the British battlecruisers sent them back to their screening positions. This confusion allowed the German light cruisers to escape, and alerted Hipper to the location of the British battlecruisers. The German battlecruisers wheeled to the north-east of the British forces and also made good their escape.

New Zealand became flagship of the 2nd BCS of the Grand Fleet on 15 January 1915, and saw action the following week in the Battle of Dogger Bank.

Battle of Dogger Bank

On 23 January 1915, a force of German battlecruisers under the command of Admiral Hipper sortied to clear Dogger Bank of any British fishing boats or small craft that might be there to collect intelligence on German movements. Alerted by decoded German transmissions, a larger force of British battlecruisers, including New Zealand, sailed under the command of Admiral Beatty to intercept. Contact was initiated at 07:20. on the 24th, when Arethusa spotted the German light cruiser .

Beatty ordered his battlecruisers to make all practical speed to catch the Germans before they could escape. New Zealand and Indomitable were the slowest of Beatty's ships, and gradually fell behind the newer battlecruisers, despite New Zealand achieving an indicated speed of 27 knots due to the original overdesign of the engines and to the efforts of her stokers. Despite dropping behind, New Zealand was able to open fire on Blücher by 09:35, and continued to engage the armoured cruiser after the other British battlecruisers had switched targets to the German battlecruisers. After about an hour, New Zealand had knocked out Blüchers forward turret, and Indomitable began to fire on her as well at 10:31. Two 12-inch shells pierced the German ship's armoured deck and exploded in an ammunition room four minutes later. At 10:48, Beatty ordered Indomitable to attack her, but the combination of a signalling error by Beatty's flag lieutenant and heavy damage to Beatty's flagship Lion, which had knocked out her radio and caused enough smoke to obscure her signal halyards, caused the rest of the British battlecruisers, temporarily under the command of Rear Admiral Sir Gordon Moore in New Zealand, to think that that signal applied to them. In response, they turned away from Hipper's main body and engaged Blücher. New Zealand fired 147 shells at Blücher before the German ship capsized and sank at 12:07 after being torpedoed by Arethusa.

Halsey had again worn the piupiu over his uniform during the battle, and the lack of damage to New Zealand was once more attributed to its good luck properties.

New Zealand was relieved by Australia as flagship of the 2nd BCS on 22 February 1915. The squadron joined the Grand Fleet in a sortie on 29 March, in response to intelligence that the German fleet was leaving port as the precursor to a major operation. By the next night, the German ships had withdrawn, and the squadron returned to Rosyth. On 11 April, the British fleet was again deployed on the intelligence that a German force was planning an operation. The Germans intended to lay mines at the Swarte Bank, but after a scouting Zeppelin located a British light cruiser squadron, they began to prepare for what they thought was a British attack. Heavy fog and the need to refuel caused Australia and the British vessels to return to port on 17 April, and although they were redeployed that night, they were unable to stop two German light cruisers from laying the minefield.

In June 1915 Halsey was promoted to Captain of the fleet with rank of Commodore on HMS Iron Duke and was succeeded as captain of New Zealand by J.F.E. (Jimmy) Green. Despite it being his personal property Halsey left the piupiu in the care of Green.

From 26 to 28 January 1916, the 2nd BCS was positioned off the Skagerrak while the 1st Light Cruiser Squadron swept the strait in an unsuccessful search for a possible minelayer.

Collison with HMAS Australia
On the morning of 21 April 1916, the 2nd BCS left Rosyth at 04:00 (accompanied by the 4th Light Cruiser Squadron and destroyers) again bound for the Skagerrak, this time to support efforts to disrupt the transport of Swedish ore to Germany. The planned destroyer sweep of the Kattegat was cancelled when word came that the High Seas Fleet was mobilising for an operation of their own (later learned to be timed to coincide with the Irish Easter Rising), and the British ships were ordered to a rendezvous point in the middle of the North Sea, with the 1st and 3rd Battlecruiser Squadrons while the rest of the Grand Fleet made for the south-eastern end of the Long Forties.
 
At 15:30 on the afternoon of 22 April, the three squadrons of battlecruisers were patrolling together to the north-west of Horn Reefs when heavy fog came down, while the ships were steaming abreast at 19.5 knots, with Australia on the port flank. Concerned about possible submarine attack Beatty issued instructions at 15:35 for the fleet to commence zigzagging. It took some time for the instruction to be relayed by signal flag down the line and so it wasn't until 15:40 that Australia with a cruiser to her port side commenced her first zigzag and swung to starboard. The crew were aware that New Zealand was on that side about five cables (926 metres) away but the poor visibility meant that as they made their turn they didn’t see her until it was too late and they hit at 15:43, despite Australia attempting to turn away to port. Australia’s side was torn open from frames 59 to 78 by the armour plate on the hull below her sister ships P-turret, while as New Zealand turned away her outer port propeller damaged Australia’s hull below her Q-turret.

Australia slowed to half-speed as the mist hid her sister ship, but the damage to New Zealand’s propeller caused a temporary loss of control and she swung back in front of Australia which despite turning to port, had her stem crushed at 15:46 as she scraped the side of New Zealand, just behind her P-turret. The damage control teams on the Australia were soon busy storing up bulkheads and sealing off the damage portions to prevent any more water entering the ship. Meanwhile off watch Australian sailors took advantage of a convenient potato locker to hurl both its contents and insults at the crew of their nearby sister ship. New Zealand was soon underway, returning to Rosyth with the rest of the squadron.

The same fog caused the battleship Neptune to collide with a merchant ship and the destroyers Ambuscade, Ardent and Garland to collide with one another.

Once it was safe to proceed Australia with her speed restricted to 12, and then later to 16 knots arrived back at Rosyth to find both drydocks occupied, one by New Zealand and the other by HMS Dreadnought so she departed for Newcastle-on-Tyne, where she was further damaged trying to dock during strong winds. As this facility couldn’t handle all of the repairs that it needed the battlecruiser was ordered to Devonport. Australia was not able to return to sea until 31 May, thus missing the Battle of Jutland.

Meanwhile New Zealand replaced her damaged propeller with Australia’s spare propeller which was in store at Rosyth and returned to the fleet on 30 May, a day before the start of the Battle of Jutland. Due to the continued absence of Australia Rear Admiral William Christopher Pakenham transferred his flag from Indefatigable to New Zealand.

Battle of Jutland

On 31 May 1916, the 2nd BCS consisted of its flagship New Zealand and Indefatigable; Australia was still under repair following her collision with New Zealand. The squadron was assigned to Admiral Beatty's Battlecruiser Fleet, which had put to sea to intercept a sortie by the High Seas Fleet into the North Sea. The British were able to decode the German radio messages and left their bases before the Germans put to sea. Hipper's battlecruisers spotted the Battlecruiser Fleet to their west at 15:20, but Beatty's ships did not spot the Germans to their east until 15:30. Two minutes later, he ordered a course change to east-south-east to position himself astride the German's line of retreat and called his ships' crews to action stations. He also ordered the 2nd BCS, which had been leading, to fall in astern of the 1st BCS. With this turn, Hipper was falling back on the High Seas Fleet, then about  behind him. Around this time, Beatty altered course to the east as it was quickly apparent that he was still too far north to cut off Hipper.

Thus began the so-called "Run to the South" as Beatty changed course to steer east-south-east at 15:45, paralleling Hipper's course, now that the range closed to under . The Germans opened fire first at 15:48, followed by the British. The British formation was echeloned to the right with Indefatigable in the rear and the furthest to the west, and New Zealand ahead of her and slightly further east. The German fire was accurate from the beginning, but the British overestimated the range as the German ships blended into the haze. Indefatigable aimed at Von der Tann, while New Zealand, disengaged herself, targeted . Indefatigable was destroyed at about 16:03, when her magazines exploded.

After Indefatigables loss, New Zealand shifted her fire to Von der Tann in accordance with Beatty's standing instructions. The range had grown too far for accurate shooting, so Beatty altered course four points to port to close the range again between 16:12 and 16:15. By this time, the 5th Battle Squadron, consisting of four s, had closed up and was engaging Von der Tann and Moltke. At 16:23, a  shell from  struck near Von der Tanns rear turret, starting a fire among the practice targets stowed there that completely obscured the ship and caused New Zealand to shift fire to Moltke. At 16:26, the ship was hit by a  shell, fired by Von der Tann, on 'X' barbette that detonated on contact and knocked loose a piece of armour that briefly jammed 'X' turret and blew a hole in the upper deck. Four minutes later, Southampton, scouting in front of Beatty's ships, spotted the lead elements of the High Seas Fleet charging north at top speed. Three minutes later, she sighted the topmasts of Vice-Admiral Reinhard Scheer's battleships, but did not transmit a message to Beatty for another five minutes. Beatty continued south for another two minutes to confirm the sighting himself before ordering a sixteen-point turn to starboard in succession. New Zealand, the last ship in the line, turned prematurely to stay outside the range of the oncoming battleships.

New Zealand was straddled several times by the battleship  but was not hit. Beatty's ships maintained full speed in an attempt to increase the distance between them and the High Seas Fleet, and gradually moved out of range. They turned north and then north-east to try to rendezvous with the main body of the Grand Fleet. At 17:40, they opened fire again on the German battlecruisers. The setting sun blinded the German gunners, and as they could not make out the British ships, they turned away to the north-east at 5:47. Beatty gradually turned more towards the east to allow him to cover the deployment of the Grand Fleet in battle formation and to move ahead of it, but he mistimed his manoeuvre and forced the leading division to fall off towards the east, further away from the Germans. By 18:35, Beatty was following Indomitable and Inflexible of the 3rd BCS as they were steering east-south-east, leading the Grand Fleet, and continuing to engage Hipper's battlecruisers to their south-west. A few minutes earlier, Scheer had ordered a simultaneous 180° starboard turn and Beatty lost sight of the High Seas Fleet in the haze. Twenty minutes later, Scheer ordered another 180° turn which put them on a converging course again with the British, which had altered course to the south. This allowed the Grand Fleet to cross Scheer's T, forming a battle line that cut across his battle line and badly damaging his leading ships. Scheer ordered yet another 180° turn at 19:13 in an attempt to extricate the High Seas Fleet from the trap into which he had sent them.

This was successful, and the British lost sight of the Germans until 8:05, when  spotted smoke bearing west-north-west. Ten minutes later, she had closed the range enough to identify German torpedo boats, and engaged them. Inflexible opened fire at 20:20, followed by the rest of Beatty's battlecruisers. Shortly after 20:30, the pre-dreadnought battleships of Rear Admiral Mauve's II Battle Squadron were spotted and fire switched to them. The Germans had poor visibility and were able to fire only a few rounds at them before turning away to the west. The British battlecruisers hit the German ships several times before they blended into the haze around 8:40. After this, Beatty changed course to south-south-east and maintained that course, ahead of both the Grand Fleet and the High Seas Fleet, until 02:55 the next morning, when the order was given to reverse course and head home.

New Zealand arrived back in Rosyth on 2 June and dropped anchor at 09:55. The crew had approximately 50 minutes rest before with the potential possibly that she may have to put to sea again they began the task of refuelling with 1,178 tons of coal and then replenishing the ammunition with 480 12-inch shells, work which continued until 03:30 on the following morning.

New Zealand fired 430 twelve-inch shells during the battle, 100 from A-turret, 129 from P-turret, 105 from Q-turret and 96 from X-turret, more than any other ship on either side.  Despite this rate of fire, only four successful hits were credited to her: three on Seydlitz and one on the pre-dreadnought . This gave a hit rate of less than one percent. Other than the single hit on X-turret the only other damage was from near misses and was minimal, consisting of a shell through the silk jack, a splinter hitting the ensign staff, the No. 3 cutter hit had some damage to its bow and the No.2 picket boat was hit in three places. This confirmed to the crew that the piupiu and hei-tiki worn by Captain Green, brought good luck.

Post-Jutland career

New Zealand was relieved by Australia as flagship on 9 June and temporarily attached to the 1st Battlecruiser Squadron, until  relieved her in September. On the evening of 18 August, the Grand Fleet put to sea in response to a message deciphered by Room 40 that indicated that the High Seas Fleet, minus II Squadron, would be leaving harbour that night. The German objective was to bombard Sunderland on 19 August, based on extensive reconnaissance provided by airships and submarines. The Grand Fleet sailed with 29 dreadnought battleships and six battlecruisers. Throughout the next day, Jellicoe and Scheer received conflicting intelligence; after reaching the location in the North Sea where the British expected to encounter the High Seas Fleet, they turned north in the erroneous belief that they had entered a minefield. Scheer turned south again, then steered south-eastward to pursue a lone British battle squadron sighted by an airship, which was in fact the Harwich Force of cruisers and destroyers under Commodore Tyrwhitt. Realising their mistake, the Germans changed course for home. The only contact came in the evening when Tyrwhitt sighted the High Seas Fleet but was unable to achieve an advantageous attack position before dark, and broke off contact. The British and the German fleets returned home; the British lost two cruisers to submarine attacks, and one German dreadnought had been torpedoed. New Zealand underwent a refit at Rosyth in November 1916. She temporarily replaced Australia as squadron flagship between 29 November and 7 January 1917.

On 1 October 1917 Green following a promotion to Rear-Admiral gave up his command of the ship, but it wasn’t until 13 December 1917 that Captain Edward Coverley Kennedy took on temporary command, which he held until 17 January 1918 when Richard Webb took over the permanent captain. Webb remained captain until September 1918 when he was made a Rear-admiral and left to take up the role of Assistant High Commissioner at Constantinople.
In the latter stages of the war a number of New Zealand soldiers on leave were able to take advantage of the open invitation extended to them by New Zealand’s captain to visit the ship.

German minesweepers and escorting light cruisers were attempting to clear British-laid minefields in the Heligoland Bight in late 1917. The Admiralty planned a large operation for 17 November to destroy the ships, and allocated two light cruiser squadrons and the 1st Cruiser Squadron covered by the reinforced 1st Battlecruiser Squadron and, more distantly, the 1st Battle Squadron of battleships. New Zealand was attached to the 1st BCS for this operation, which became known as the Second Battle of Heligoland Bight. New Zealand did not fire her guns during the battle. As in previous engagements, Captain Green wore the piupiu and tiki for luck.

During 1918, New Zealand and the Grand Fleet's other capital ships were used on occasion to escort convoys between the United Kingdom and Norway. The 2nd BCS spent the period from 8 to 21 February covering these convoys in company with battleships and destroyers, and put to sea on 6 March in company with the 1st BCS to support minelayers. The 2nd BCS again supported minelayers in the North Sea from 25 June or 26 June to the end of July. During September and October, New Zealand and the 2nd BCS supervised and protected minelaying operations north of Orkney.

By the time of the 1918 armistice  New Zealand had since August 1914 sailed 84,458 nautical miles, consumed 97,034 tons of coal and fired a total of 664 12-inch shells in action.

As a member of the 2nd BCS the battlecruiser was present at the surrender of the High Seas Fleet in November 1918. To witness the event New Zealand embarked five soldiers from the New Zealand Division and a New Zealand newspaper reporter. New Zealand was assigned responsibility for checking the compliance of SMS Derfflinger with the terms of its internment.

Post-war

In September 1918 Leonard Andrew Boyd Donaldson took over command of the ship and remained in command until 11 February 1919.
In December 1918 New Zealand was used to convey Queen Maud and Prince Olav from Norway for their state visit of the United Kingdom.

With the war at an end most of the United Kingdom’s older capital ships were put into reserve, as they were by now obsolete and with the government wishing to make significant cuts in its military expenditure there was little chance of their returning to full service, especially once the formal peace treaty was signed with Germany  in mid-1919. One exception was New Zealand, which it was decided would be used to transport, Admiral Jellicoe on what was to be an expected yearlong visit to India and the dominions  of Australia, Canada, and New Zealand to assist with planning and coordinating their naval policies and defences.
 
To prepare her for voyage the battlecruiser underwent a refit between December 1918 and 11 February 1919 at the end of which she was recommissioned with a virtually all new crew under the command of Captain Oliver Elles Leggett. Among the crew were four New Zealanders, Alexander David Boyle who was by now a Lieutenant Commander, Surgeon Lieutenant George Donald Macintosh, Sub-Lieutenant Mervyn S. Thomas and midshipman Derek Perry. Lady Jellicoe accompanied her husband, as well as a staff of eight to assist him with his work. Also on the ship was Clutha Mackenzie (the blind son of the New Zealand High Commissioner) who was returning to New Zealand as Jellicoe's guest.

The battlecruiser departed Portsmouth on 31 February 1919 and while crossing the Bay of Biscay encountered a storm that forced the evacuation of the newly constructed accommodation for Jellicoe and his staff when it became apparent that the dockyard had failed to seal the holes in the structure.  After a 24 hour stop at Gibraltar for Jellicoe to make his first official visit the battlecruiser continued onto Port Said to take on approximately 2,000 tons of coal before continuing through the Suez Canal to make a brief stop at Suez where Jellicoe rejoined it (having left it at Port Said to visit Cairo) before crossing the Arabian Sea Ocean to reach Bombay Bombay on 14 March. While Jellicoe was engaged in a week of consultations in Delhi, 1,740 tons of coal was taken on board and the opportunity was taken for the battlecruiser to be painted in the dockyard. This was completed on 22 March, just in time for the ship to host a ball three days later. The battlecruiser then made a two day visit to Karachi before returning to Bombay. Unfortunately while in Karachi a sailor, A. B. Rennie was killed after falling off a balcony while on shore. Once back in Bombay some of the crew got into trouble while on shore leave, which was cancelled in response.

New Zealand departed Bombay on 1 May for Columbo, which was reached two days later, where 1,800 tons of coal and 700 tons of oil was taken on board, in preparation for the journey across the Indian Ocean. By the 9 May the battlecruiser was in the vicinity of the Cocos (Keeling) Islands and the opportunity was taken to divert so that the crew could see the remains of SMS Emden.

The battlecruiser arrived at Albany, Western Australia, on 15 May, where Jellicoe and his staff disembarked to take an overland route across the country. New Zealand sailed via Perth, Outer Harbour (near Adelaide), Melbourne and Hobart with the opportunity taken for New Zealand to exercise with Australia and other units of the RAN prior to reaching Sydney.  Here the ship was drydocked in Sunderland Dock at Cockatoo Island where its bottom was scraped and painted, before being refloated and coaled. The battlecruiser left Sydney on 16 August for New Zealand.

Wellington was reached on 20 August, where, as the influenza pandemic was rampant. As a result the crew was subjected to a medical inspection before anyone was allowed to disembark. While in Wellington the ship was visited by approximately 50,000 New Zealanders prior to the 24  August before it proceeded south to Lyttelton, which was reached on 1 September. The ship then proceeded north to anchor off Picton on 13 September where it spent two days and then after a stop in Wellington it sailed up the east coast of the North Island to reach Auckland on 22 September. Jellicoe During the next six weeks he visited ports throughout the country and carried out, while preparing a three-volume report for the government. The ship was particularly popular in New Zealand, with Jellicoe, the officers and crew attending numerous social engagements. The tour around the country allowed Jellicoe and his staff to familiarize themselves with the country as they  prepared recommendations for the New Zealand government on its naval policy. Crowds flocked to visit the battlecruiser as they had done in 1913. Jellicoe, too, was popular and he later returned to New Zealand to serve as Governor-General from 1920 to 1924.
 
The battlecruiser left Auckland on 3 October, briefing stopping at Suva in Fiji and Samoa with mail, where at the latter her 12-inch guns were fired to entertain the local chiefs, then Fanning Island for (six hours) and Hawaii. Enroute the ship called upon Christmas Island (Kiritimati), southeast of Fanning Island, on 19 November 1920, thinking it uninhabited. Instead, they were greeted by Joe English, of Medford, Massachusetts, who had been manager of a copra plantation on the island, but had become marooned with two others, when the war had broken out. The men were rescued.

The battlecruiser arrived in Canada, the final country to be assessed when it docked on 8 November and docking at Esquimalt on Vancouver Island. The Jellicoes left the ship on 20 November to tour Canada and the United States by train before re-joining it in Key West.
On 11 November 1919 two rugby teams from the ship  competed against local teams from Victoria. The officers played the Wanderers and the crew played V.I.A.A (Vancouver Island Athletic Association).

After leaving Vancouver the ship stopped at San Diego, before passing via the Panama Canal into the Caribbean where as well as visiting Havana time was spent in Jamaica, where exercising of the main armament was undertaken. During a stop at Port of Spain on the island of Trinidad Petty Officer Thorn fell off a wharf and was drowned. Heading north the battlecruiser picked Jellicoe at Key West on 8 January 1920 

The battlecruiser reached Portsmouth on 3 February 1920 having covered 33,514 nautical miles.  As Jellicoe had been promoted to Admiral of the Fleet while overseas the ship was greeted by the appropriate 19-gun salute from HMS Victory.

Put into reserve
On 6 February New Zealand was pulled by tugs to a mooring on the Hamoaze. Most of the crew sent on six weeks leave, with a skeleton crew of 250 remaining behind under the command of Lieutenant Commander Alexander David Boyle.

Leggett gave up command of New Zealand and was succeeded by Captain Hartley Russell Gwennap Moore (1881–1953) on 11 March 1920. Moore remained in that position until July 1921.

New Zealand was paid off into reserve on 15 March 1920. By this time the battlecruiser was regarded as obsolete by the Royal Navy, as she was coal powered and her 12-inch guns were inferior to the  guns deployed on the latest generation of capital ships.

New Zealand was briefly recommissioned on 1 July 1921 with a reserve crew to replace HMS Hercules as flagship at Rosyth under the command of Captain Ralph Eliot (1881–1958), who had previously been in command of Hercules.
Eliot was to be the ship’s last captain, and remained in command until 1 September 1921.

Scrapping
Along with all of the other British 12-inch battleships and battlecruisers it was agreed that New Zealand would be scrapped to meet the tonnage restrictions set on the British Empire by the Washington Naval Treaty.
 
New Zealand was sold for scrap together with Agincourt and Princess Royal to the Exeter based electrical engineering firm of J&W Purves with the proviso that they had to be demolished within 18 months of the Washington Naval Treaty being ratified.  
To meet the Admiralty’s desire to provided work for unemployed dock workers at Rosyth Dockyard the contract was immediately transferred the contract to a new entity chaired by A. Wallace Cowan (1877–1964) called the Rosyth Shipbreaking Company which would undertake the scrapping of the vessels at Rosyth. It took until 19 December 1922 to legally organize the transfer of the ships from the Royal Navy to the new company, which had among its directors Admiral J.F.E. Green who had commanded the ship at the Battle of Jutland. Leased facilities were set up adjacent to where the vessels were lying alongside a wharf on the south side of the main basin in the Naval Dockyard at Rosyth. The vessels were taken over on 25 January 1923 with work commencing first on New Zealand. By March 1923 her superstructure had been removed and she was moved out of the basin and beached above the low tide mark on a beach outside of the wall of the northwest dockyard. A large portion of  New Zealand;s hull was still being dismantled in July 1924 and it wasn’t until September 1924 that the last components of New Zealand were removed from the site. And her place on the beach was taken over by the Princess Royal.
Between them the three vessels yielded 40,000 tons of steel, approximately 10,000 tons of armour plate and even 3,000 tons of coal still in their bunkers.

The New Zealand government received £20,000 from the sale of the vessel.

The New Zealand Government completed paying off the loan used to fund the ship in the 1944/45 financial year.

Artifacts

By the time of the decision to scrap New Zealand had a impressive collection of silverware and trophies (officially listed at 47 in January 1919).

As well as the above mentioned silverware and trophies numerous other items were removed from the vessel prior to scrapping and sent back to New Zealand. Among the items were the ship's bell, a boomerang, two greenstone mere (clubs), silver cups, gunnery shields, two hei-tiki, a complete laundry, a 42-foot long motor launch, the ship’s flags, some searchlights, a steering wheel, four 4-inch QF guns and associated rangefinders. Some furniture was sent to the High Commission in London, though they lost out on the wardroom buffet, which ended up in New Zealand’s Parliament restaurant, Bellamy’s. Most of these items arrived in New Zealand in late 1923. The ship’s former captains were sent furniture from the captain’s cabin.
 
The 4-inch guns, a range finder and laundry equipment, were used by military units. During the Second World War, the 4-inch guns were the main armament of the land batteries which protected the entrances to the harbours at Auckland, Wellington and Lyttelton. Two of these guns have since 23 November 1929 been located outside of the northern entrance to the Auckland War Memorial Museum. At the outbreak of World War Two, they were removed with one being returned to service while the other gun which was too damaged to repair, was placed in storage at the museum. Two guns were once again returned to display outside the museum in 1959.

On 12 December 1924 A. Wallace Cowan presented an ink stand and cigar boxes made from the ship’s timbers to New Zealand High Commissioner Sir James Allen and current New Zealand Prime Minister William Massey (who was in the United Kingdom at the time), while a third cigar box was sent to Ward.  One of these cigar boxes is currently held by the Auckland Museum. Teak from the ship was used as flooring in Cowan’s house. A photo album of the breaking up of the vessel was presented by Cowan’s daughter to the New Zealand Royal Navy in 1968 and is now held by National Archives New Zealand.

Auckland War Memorial Museum has among its collection Pelorus Jack’s silver collar (a gift received from the New Zealanders of Transvaal), another brass-studded collar and his harness. Another collar, gifted by the Pretoria Public Works Department, is held by the Royal New Zealand Navy Museum, Devonport.

The other artifacts are on display in various museums in New Zealand. The hei-tiki donated by  C. J. Sloman has been in the Canterbury Museum since 1932. Having once been on display in the Wellington Maritime Museum the auxiliary steering wheel and an engine telegraph are now, together with other items is in the possession of Museum of New Zealand Te Papa Tongarewa in Wellington.

Other than for when it was lent for display at the 1940 Centennial Exhibition in New Zealand the captain's piupiu remained with Halsey until his death in 1949. His daughter Ruth bequeathed it to New Zealand upon her death in 2002 and since 2005 it has been on display at the Torpedo Bay Navy Museum in Auckland alongside the ship's bell, the wardroom buffet and other artifacts, including the piece of armour knocked off of X-turret at the Battle of Jutland. When HMS Queen Mary exploded at the Battle of Jutland debris from the ship fell on New Zealand, among which was a ring-bolt. This is now in the collection of the Torpedo Bay Navy Museum.

The South Canterbury Museum in Timaru, New Zealand holds the silk naval ensign which flew from HMS "New Zealand" during all of its naval engagements in World War I (including at the Battle of Jutland). The naval ensign and a union jack were purchased by the women's branch of the Navy League in Timaru and presented to the ship  when it visited Timaru in May 1913.

Ship's mascot

The ship’s first mascot was a bulldog donated by a New Zealander resident in London and named after the famous dolphin that greeted ships at French pass in the Marlborough Sounds of New Zealand. The first was "discharged dead" from the Navy on 24 April 1916 after falling down the forward funnel. His will requested not only that his successor be a “bull pup of honest parentage, clean habits, and moral tendencies”, but also that “no Dachshound or other dog of Teutonic extraction” be permitted on board the ship (except as rations for his successor).

His successor’s service at the Battle of Jutland  caused him to become afraid of gunfire and when it was considered it was unlikely he could survive the ship’s return voyage through the tropics back to the United Kingdom he was discharged with the rank of leading sea dog and given to the people of Auckland in October 1919. Following six month quarantine Jack was taken under the care of the superintendent of parks.

Footnotes

References

Bibliography

Further reading
 
  Carne served as a midshipman on HMS New Zealand at the Battle of Jutland.

External links

 A New Zealander at the Battle of Jutland. Audio of Lieutenant Alexander David Boyle of HMS "New Zealand" recalling his experiences at the Battle of Jutland.
 Auckland's Reception to the Battleship HMS New Zealand. Historic film of the battlecruiser steaming into the Hauraki Gulf on 29 April 1913. Taken by Charles Newham.
 Battle of Heligoland Bight – LT AD Boyle. Extracts from the diary of Lieutenant Alexander David Boyle.
 Battle of Jutland Crew Lists Project – HMS New Zealand Crew List
 Crossing the Line. Describes the ceremony that occurred when crossed the equator in the Indian Ocean on her 1919 world tour.
 HMS New Zealand [H.C. Gore. Extracts]. Historic film of the battlecruiser during her visit to Otago Harbour taken by Henry Gore in June 1913.
 HMS New Zealand (1914-1918). Historic film of Sir John Jellicoe and staff aboard the battlecruiser at Portsmouth in February 1919 prior to departure on his tour to Canada, Australia and New Zealand.
 
 Imperial War Museums: Lives of the First World War: HMS New Zealand at the Battle of Jutland (Crew List)
 King George V Inspects HMS New Zealand. Historic film of the battlecruiser being inspected by King George V at the Portsmouth Royal Dockyard on 5 February 1913 just prior to departing on her world cruise. Present were Rear Admiral Herbert Leopold Heath, Winston Churchill, Sir Thomas Mackenzie, Sir Joseph Ward, James Allen, Sir John Jellicoe, Prince Louis of Battenberg and Sir Hedworth Meux.
 Objects related to HMS New Zealand from the collection of the Museum of New Zealand Te Papa Tongarewa
 Record of HMS New Zealand from RNZN History
 

1911 ships
Ships built in Govan
Indefatigable-class battlecruisers
World War I battlecruisers of the United Kingdom